Following is a list of senators of Lot-et-Garonne, people who have represented the department of Lot-et-Garonne in the Senate of France.

Third Republic

Senators for Lot-et-Garonne under the French Third Republic were:

 Octave de Bastard d'Estang (1876–1879)
 Raymond Noubel (1876–1879)
 Louis Pons (1879–1888)
 Léopold Faye (1879–1900)
 Édouard Laporte (1885–1890)
 Jean-Baptiste Durand (1888–1897)
 Armand Fallières (1890–1906)
 Joseph Chaumié (1897–1919)
 Édouard Giresse (1900–1914)
 Gaston Belhomme (1906–1920)
 Jean Galup (1914–1920)
 Pierre Marraud (1920–1933)
 Georges Laboulbene (1920–1934)
 Gaston Carrère (1920–1936)
 André Fallières (1933–1940)
 Pierre Chaumié (1935–1940)
 Georges Escande (1936–1940)

Fourth Republic

Senators for Lot-et-Garonne under the French Fourth Republic were:

 Jacques Bordeneuve (1946–1959)
 Jean Zyromski (1946–1948)
 Étienne Restat (1948–1959)

Fifth Republic 
Senators for Lot-et-Garonne under the French Fifth Republic:

 Jacques Bordeneuve (1959–1967 and 1974–1981)
 Étienne Restat (1959–1971)
 Henri Caillavet (1967–1983)
 Raoul Perpère (1971–1974)
 Raymond Soucaret (1981–2001)
 Jean François-Poncet (UMP) (1983–2011)
 Daniel Soulage (Union centriste) (2001–2011)
 Pierre Camani (PS) (2011–20170
 Henri Tandonnet (DVD) (2011–2017)
 Christine Bonfanti-Dossat (LR) (from 2017)
 Jean-Pierre Moga (from 2017}

References

Sources

 
Lists of members of the Senate (France) by department